Carnosine synthase is an enzyme that catalyzes the chemical reaction

ATP + L-histidine + beta-alanine  ADP + phosphate + carnosine

The 3 substrates of this enzyme are ATP, L-histidine, and beta-alanine, whereas its 3 products are ADP (previously thought to form AMP), diphosphate, and carnosine.

This enzyme belongs to the family of ligases, specifically those forming carbon-nitrogen bonds as acid-D-amino-acid ligases (peptide synthases).  The systematic name of this enzyme class is 'L-histidine:beta-alanine ligase (AMP-forming)' (incorrect on AMP-forming). Other names in common use include 'carnosine synthetase', 'carnosine-anserine synthetase', 'homocarnosine synthetase', and 'carnosine-homocarnosine synthetase'.

Gene
The gene encoding this enzyme has been identified by Jakub Drozak and coworkers in 2010. The gene encoding the Carnosine synthase is ATPGD1, a member of the “ATP-grasp family” of ligases. Because of its involvement in the formation of carnosine, this gene is now also named 'CARNS1'.

References

 
 

EC 6.3.2
Enzymes of unknown structure